Dover Grammar School for Girls is a community grammar school for girls, aged between 11 and 16, and a joint sixth-form with boys between the age of 16 and 18, in Dover, England.

School History
The school can trace back its origins to 1904 when the County School for Boys and Girls formed as a result of the amalgamation of the Dover Pupil Teacher Centre (founded in 1894) and The Municipal Secondary School (founded in 1890).

In 1910, the County School split into 2 separate entities, Dover County School for Boys and Dover County School for Girls and, after housed in several buildings in Dover (Effingham Crescent, Godwyne Road and Maison Dieu Road), the school moved to  the Boy's premises in Frith Road in 1934 who relocated to Astor Avenue.

The school's houses are Hubert de Burgh 1st Earl of Kent, St Martin, Queen Ethelburga, and Stephen de Pencester with the names chosen in a poll by the students and have never changed.

During World War II, pupils and staff of the school were evacuated to Caerleon Training College in Wales, part of the University of South Wales.

Post-War Developments

In 1990, following a new government formula-funding scheme, proposals were made to move Dover Grammar School for Boys and the Girls' school to the former vacated Castlemount School site but this was abandoned following opposition from staff, parents and the general public.

In 1991, education chiefs considered moving the 2 grammar schools to a single site in Whitfield. Instead, it was agreed to create a joint 6th form with DGSB which continues to this day.

In 2007, as part of the Specialist schools programme, the grammar school was allowed to concentrate in the humanities.

In 2008, plans were drawn to relocate the 2 Dover grammar schools to one site in Whitfield, led by the Kent County Council under the Building Schools for the Future programme but this was cancelled in 2010.

In 2018, the governors approved the building of a new Science block on the site of the music mobile. New state of the art Science facilities will be ready in 2019 and include four large laboratories, a small staff room and a Prep room.

Admissions 
The school is selective and participates in order to gain entry the prospective student must first pass the 11+ examination, informally known as the "Kent Test" or the Dover Test, children able to take both.

Headteachers 

 Ms Jesse Chapman, (1910-1926)
 Ms Helen Scott, (1926-1928)
 Ms Edith May Gruer MA (Aberdeen), (1928-1951)
 Ms Marian Sergeant MA (Oxon), (1951-1965)
 Ms Lillian V Kay BA (London), PGCE (Cantab), (1965-1977)
 Ms Joan R Hasler MA (Oxon), (1977-1986)
 Ms Elizabeth J Davis, (1986-1992)
 Dr Roger Thurling BSc, PhD (Kent), (1992-1994)
 Ms Elizabeth Lewis, (1994-1999)
 Mrs Julia Bell BA (UEA), PGCE (London), (1999-2004)
 Mrs Judith Carlisle BA (Bristol), (2004-2010)
 Mr Matthew Bartlett MA (Cantab), (2010-2016)
 Mr Robert Benson BSc (Exeter), PGCE, MA (CCCU), (2016 -)

Notable alumnae 
 Ruth and May Bell, twin fashion models

References

External links
Dover County School - a history of DBGS

Girls' schools in Kent
Grammar schools in Kent
Grammar
Educational institutions established in 1904
1904 establishments in England
Community schools in Kent